The Los Angeles Sparks (LA Sparks) are an American professional basketball team based in Los Angeles. The Sparks compete in the Women's National Basketball Association (WNBA) as a member club of the league's Western Conference. The team was founded before the league's inaugural 1997 season began. Like some other WNBA teams, the Sparks have the distinction of not being affiliated with an NBA counterpart, even though the market is shared with the Los Angeles Lakers and the Los Angeles Clippers. As of 2020, the Sparks are the most recent franchise to win back-to-back titles.

Lakers owner Jerry Buss owned the Sparks from 1997 to 2006 when Williams Group Holdings purchased the team. It was previously the sister team of the Los Angeles Lakers. As of 2014, the Sparks are owned by Sparks LA Sports, LLC.

The Sparks have qualified for the WNBA Playoffs in twenty of their twenty-four years in Los Angeles, more than any other team in the league. The franchise has been home to many high-quality players such as  center and Tennessee standout Candace Parker, flashy point guard Nikki Teasley, and nearby USC alums Lisa Leslie and Tina Thompson. In 2001, 2002, 2003, 2016 and 2017, the Sparks went to the WNBA Finals. They won the title in 2001, 2002, and 2016, beating Charlotte, New York, and Minnesota respectively, but fell short to Detroit in 2003 and Minnesota in 2017.

Being in a major national market, the Sparks have always been a focal point of the league; they faced New York in the league's inaugural game on June 21, 1997.

Franchise history

1997–2000: Beginnings and bright future 
The 1997 WNBA season, the league's first, opened with a game between the Sparks and the New York Liberty at the Sparks home (The Forum) in Inglewood. The Sparks lost the game 57–67. Sparks player Penny Toler scored the league's first two points with a lay-up 59 seconds into the game. The Sparks finished with a record of 14–14. The team did compete for a playoff spot, but because of a loss to the Phoenix Mercury in the final game of the season, the Sparks missed the playoffs. In the 1998 WNBA season, the Sparks finished 12–18, missing the playoffs once more.

The 1999 season featured the development of Lisa Leslie and the Sparks' first playoff berth, as the Sparks posted a 20–12 record. The Sparks won their first playoff game and series with a win over the Sacramento Monarchs. They played in the Western Conference Finals but fell to the defending champion Houston Comets, 2 games to 1, in the three-game series.

The 2000 season was a record one, as the Sparks had a 28–4 record, the best in league history, and second only to the 1998 Houston Comets for best all-time. In the playoffs, the Sparks swept the Phoenix Mercury in the first round but lost in the Western Conference Finals again, when they were swept by the Comets. Ultimately, the Sparks were playing in the shadow of the Comets, who won the first four WNBA championships.

2001–2002: Back-to-back championships 
The 2000–01 off-season saw a move to the Staples Center and a coaching change, when the Sparks hired former Los Angeles Lakers player Michael Cooper as head coach. During the ensuing regular season, the Sparks again posted a 28–4 record. In the 2001 playoffs, the Sparks finally eliminated the Comets, sweeping them in the first round. The Sparks took all three games to eliminate the Monarchs to earn their first berth in the WNBA Finals, in which they swept the Charlotte Sting, 2–0, for their first league championship.

In 2002, Leslie became the first woman in the league to dunk the ball during a game, and once again the Sparks dominated the regular season, posting a 25–7 record. The Sparks then flew through the playoffs, sweeping both the Seattle Storm and the Utah Starzz. In the finals, the Sparks were matched against the Liberty, who were still looking for their first championship. A late three-pointer in game 2 by Nikki Teasley gave the Sparks their second consecutive championship.

2003: Chasing a three-peat 
In 2003, the Sparks posted a 24–10 record and went into the playoffs looking for a "three-peat". Both the first and the second rounds were forced to deciding third games, as they beat the Minnesota Lynx and Sacramento Monarchs. The Sparks then faced the upstart Detroit Shock in the Finals. The Shock were on a roll after having been the worst team in the WNBA in 2002. The Finals were a battle fueled by the relationship between head coaches Michael Cooper (Sparks) and Bill Laimbeer (Shock) which stemmed from their days in the NBA. The rough road to the finals and the tough play of the Shock wore down the Sparks, who lost the series two games to one and failed to three-peat.

2004–2006: Further championship contention 
During the 2003-04 off-season, the Sparks signed two players, Tamika Whitmore and Teresa Weatherspoon, who had played for the New York Liberty. When the season began, the Sparks got off to a great start, but coach Cooper left at mid-season to seek a coaching job in the NBA. The loss of their coach was a factor in the team's so-so finish to the season, which ended with a record of 25–9. During the playoffs, the team lost in three games to the Sacramento Monarchs.

The Sparks never recovered through the 2005 season and finished with a 17–17 record. They barely made the playoffs as the number-four seed. In the first round, the Sparks were outplayed and swept by the eventual champion Monarchs.

In 2006, the Sparks played much better, posting a 25–9 record. In the playoffs, they defeated the Seattle Storm in three games. However, in the Western Conference finals, the Sparks' season was ended by the Monarchs for the third year in a row.

2007: Rock bottom 

After the 2006 season ended, team owner Jerry Buss, who also owned the Lakers, announced he was selling the Sparks. On December 7, 2006, the Los Angeles Times reported the sale to an investor group led by Kathy Goodman and Carla Christofferson. Goodman is currently a high school teacher at HighTech-LA in Lake Balboa and was a former executive for Intermedia Films. Christofferson is a litigation attorney for the O’Melveny & Myers law firm and was Miss North Dakota USA in 1989. The day after the sale was announced, team star Lisa Leslie announced that she was pregnant and would not play in the WNBA in the 2007 season.

The loss of Leslie for the year proved devastating, as the Sparks posted a league-worst 10–24 record. The record was also the worst in Sparks history, as the Sparks missed the playoffs for the first time since 1998.

2008–2015: Lisa Leslie's final years, the rise of Candace Parker, falling short and new ownership 
Before the start of the 2008 season, the team's prospects improved dramatically. Lisa Leslie returned to the team, and on April 9, 2008, the team used its number-one draft pick to select Candace Parker, the college player of the year, the morning after Parker had led the University of Tennessee Lady Vols to their second-straight NCAA championship.

In 2008, the Sparks posted a 20–14 record and finished third in the Western Conference. Parker had won Rookie of the Year and WNBA MVP, becoming the first player in WNBA history to win both awards in the same season. In the playoffs, the Sparks beat the Seattle Storm 2–1 to reach the Western Conference Finals and compete against the San Antonio Silver Stars. The Sparks were on track to win game 2 of the series, but Silver Star Sophia Young made a turn-around bank-shot with a second left on the clock to force the series to a deciding game three. The Sparks lost game three, and the Silver Stars moved on to the WNBA Finals.

Following the 2008 season, Parker announced that she was pregnant. To compensate for Parker's absence, the Sparks signed native veteran superstar Tina Thompson (who had previously played for the former rival Houston Comets) and former Finals MVP Betty Lennox in free agency. With the addition of Thompson and Lennox, the Sparks added more championship experience and veteran leadership to their roster to them help them compete for another title.

The 2009 season had started poorly for the Sparks. Parker began the season on maternity leave, and Leslie suffered a knee injury early in the season. Both Leslie and Parker returned to the court in July, however, sparking a 10–2 run which turned an 8–14 start into an 18–16 regular-season record and clinching the Sparks' tenth playoff appearance in their 13-year history. In the first round of the playoffs, the Sparks defeated the Seattle Storm for the third time in four years. In the Western Conference Finals, the Sparks' lost to the eventual champion Phoenix Mercury in three games. The end of the 2009 playoff run marked the end of Leslie's career as a player and Cooper's second tenure as Sparks' head coach. In the off-season, former Sparks player Jennifer Gillom became the team's new head coach.

With the acquisition of former All-Star point guard Ticha Penicheiro and Parker establishing herself as the team's next franchise player, the 2010 Sparks believed they had the pieces to contend for a championship. However, Parker had season-ending shoulder surgery after the team started 3–7. Without her, the Sparks struggled, finishing 13–21, which was good enough to qualify them for fourth place in the Western Conference, but they were swept by the eventual champion Seattle Storm in the first round.

The 2011 season was eerily reminiscent of the previous year for the Sparks. The team started 4–3 but again Parker sustained an injury. Following three more losses, the Sparks fired head coach Gillom, promoting previous Sparks coach Joe Bryant. With Parker out until the end of the season, the Sparks headed into the All-Star break 6–8 and in fifth place. The Sparks finished the season three games out of the playoffs with a 15–19 record. Thompson would become a free agent and sign with the Seattle Storm.

In the 2012 season, the Sparks significantly improved, making it back to the playoffs since 2010, finishing second in the Western Conference with a 24–10 record. That same year they drafted Rookie of the Year and future MVP Nneka Ogwumike with the number-one pick. However, the Sparks were eliminated 2–0 in the first round by the Minnesota Lynx.

The team was owned by Williams Group Holdings (Paula Madison, majority owner) and Carla Christofferson, Nicholas J H, and Lisa Leslie (minority owners) until January 2014 when it was abruptly announced that WGH would relinquish all control. Paula Madison said that since becoming an owner in 2007, she and her family had lost $12 million, including $1.4 million in 2013. The team was temporarily absorbed by the league, and was then purchased by Sparks LA Sports, a group that included former NBA player Magic Johnson.

The 2014 and 2015 seasons would be disappointing for the Sparks as they had continued to be an underachieving playoff team, getting eliminated in the first round both years by the Phoenix Mercury and Minnesota Lynx respectively.

2016: Champions once again 
After making the playoffs in 2015, losing in the first round, the Sparks made subtle roster changes and improved the following year. Suddenly showing signs of championship contention, they finished with a 26–8 record and made it to the 2016 WNBA Playoffs. By this time, the Sparks had a "Big Three", consisting of Candace Parker, Nneka Ogwumike and Kristi Toliver. They earned the number 2 seed in the league and received a double bye to the semi-finals with the WNBA's new playoff format. The Sparks faced off against the Chicago Sky in the semi-finals and defeated the Sky 3 games to 1 to advance to the Finals for the first time since 2003. They faced the number 1 seeded Minnesota Lynx in the finals. They stole game 1 on the road when veteran forward Alana Beard made a game-winning jumper at the buzzer, lifting the team to a 78–76 victory. They lost game 2 79–60, but back in Los Angeles, put themselves one win away from their first title in over a decade with a dominant 92–75 game 3 victory. Even though they expected to clinch a championship on their home floor, they lost game 4 in a disappointing finish of 85–79. Game 5 was truly historic, against all odds, and swarmed with Minnesota fans, the 2016 WNBA MVP, Nneka Ogwumike grabbed an offensive rebound and made the game-winning shot to put the Sparks ahead 77–76 with 3.1 seconds remaining. The Sparks won their first championship since 2002 and their third championship in franchise history. Candace Parker was named the Finals MVP.

2017–present: Hunting more championships 
Coming into the 2017 season, the Sparks had some changes made in their roster. Toliver left the Sparks in free agency to join the Washington Mystics, Chelsea Gray became the starting point guard, the Sparks traded for Odyssey Sims, drafted Sydney Wiese and retooled most of their bench, but kept their core intact. The Sparks once again finished as the second best team in the league with a 26–8 record with a double-bye to the semi-finals. The Sparks swept the Phoenix Mercury 3-0 in the semi-finals, advancing to the Finals for the second season in a row, setting up a rematch with the Lynx. In Game 1, Gray made a game-winning jumper with 2 seconds left to give the Sparks a 1-0 series lead. In Game 3, Parker set the Finals record for most steals in a game with 5 steals as the Sparks were up 2–1 in the Finals. With another opportunity to close out the series at home, the Sparks failed to deliver as they lost Game 4 80–69, extending the series to a deciding Game 5. The Sparks would lose Game 5, failing to win back-to-back championships.

In 2018, the Sparks continued to hold onto their core, but would underperform during the season, this time they would finish as the number 6 seed with a 19–15 record. They would start off their playoff run against the rival championship-defending Minnesota Lynx. They would defeat the Lynx 75–68, advancing to the second round. In the second round elimination game, the Sparks lost 96–64 to the Washington Mystics, ending their run of two consecutive finals appearances.

According to Matthew Shapiro of WNBA.com, the Sparks are the most historic franchise in the WNBA.

After the 2018 season, Brian Agler resigned as the coach of the Sparks.  One month later, the Sparks announced that Derek Fisher had been hired as a replacement.

After the 2019 season, Penny Toler was dismissed as general manager.

On June 7, 2022, the Sparks and Fisher parted ways as Head Coach and General Manager after the Sparks started the year off 5-7 after bringing in Liz Cambage. Fisher went 54-46 as head coach during his Sparks tenure.

Current home 
The Los Angeles Sparks currently play in the Crypto.com Arena in Los Angeles, California. The capacity for a Sparks game is 13,141 because the upper level is closed off (capacity for a Lakers game is 18,997). The Sparks have played in the Crypto.com Arena since 2001. They previously played at The Forum but stayed there for two years after the Lakers departed for Crypto.com Arena until the venue was purchased by a local church.

Uniforms 
 2021–present: Nike and the WNBA unveiled new designs for all of its teams, and announced new edition uniforms. The Sparks unveiled a white uniform for the first time; all white uniforms were placed under the "Heroine" series. The purple uniform became part of the "Explorer" series, while a black third uniform was released as part of the "Rebel" series. The "Rebel" uniforms are similar to the NBA's "City" edition in that it evokes city or team culture and pride.
 2018–2020: Nike replaced Adidas as uniform provider. EquiTrust remains jersey sponsor, while slight tweaks were made in the fonts and striping. Similar to the NBA, Nike's WNBA uniforms were classified under the "Icon" and "Statement" series, with the Sparks' gold and purple jerseys designated as such.
 2015–2017: EquiTrust Life Insurance becomes new jersey sponsor; jersey remains unchanged other than the addition of the name of the sponsor. 
 2013–2014: Farmers Insurance naming rights expire, and the team name returns on both jerseys. In addition a modified font for the jersey numbers was introduced.
 2011–2012: As part of the move to Adidas's Revolution 30 technology, the Sparks unveiled new jerseys. Home uniforms remain gold, but numbers are now rounded and in white with purple trim. Away uniforms are purple with numbers in white with gold trim. The Farmers Insurance name will remain on the jerseys.
 2009–2010: On June 5, the Los Angeles Sparks and Farmers Insurance Group of Companies announced a multi-year marketing partnership that includes a branded jersey sponsorship. The Farmers Insurance branded jersey was worn by the players for the first time on June 6, 2009. As part of this alliance, the Farmers Insurance name and logo will appear on the front of the Sparks jerseys. In the 2009 season, the Sparks yellow jersey is used regardless of home or away. In the 2010 season they introduced the purple jersey for away games.
 2007–2008: For home games, gold with purple lines and sparks on the side, with the name "Sparks" written across in purple. For away games, purple with golden yellow lines and sparks on the side, with the name "Los Angeles" in yellow. The uniform looks similar to the Los Angeles Lakers' uniform.
 1997–2006: For home games, gold with large purple stripe on the side, with the name "Sparks" written across in purple. For away games, purple with large gold stripe on the side, with the name "Los Angeles" in yellow.

Season-by-season records

Players

Current roster 
Current injuries are not updated.

Other rights owned

Retired numbers

FIBA Hall of Fame

Coaches and staff

Owners 
Jerry Buss, owner of the Los Angeles Lakers (1997–2006)
Gemini Basketball LLC, composed of Carla Christofferson, Kathy Goodman, and Lynai Jones (2006–2011)
Williams Group Holdings (Paula Madison) (2011–2014) and Carla Christofferson, Kathy Goodman, and Lisa Leslie (2011–2013)
Sparks LA Sports, LLC (Mark Walter, Magic Johnson, Stan Kasten, Todd Boehly and Bobby Patton) (2014–present)

Head coaches

General Managers 
Rhonda Windham (1997–1999)
Penny Toler (2000–2019)
Derek Fisher (2021–2022)
Karen Bryant (2023–Present)

Assistant coaches 
Julie Rousseau (1997)
Orlando Woolridge (1998)
Michael Cooper (1999)
Marianne Stanley (2000, 2008–2009)
Glenn McDonald (2000–2002)
Karleen Thompson (2002–2004)
Ryan Weisenberg (2003–2004)
Bob Webb (2005)
Shelley Patterson (2005)
Michael Abraham (2006–2007)
Margaret Mohr (2006–2007)
Laura Beeman (2008–2009)
Larry Smith (2008)
Steve Smith (1998, 2009–2010, 2014, 2023–present)
Sandy Brondello (2011–2013)
Joe Bryant (2011)
Jim Lewis (2012)
Bridget Pettis (2013)
Gail Goestenkors (2014)
Gary Kloppenburg (2014)
Curt Miller (2015)
Amber Stocks (2015–2016)
Tonya Edwards (2016–2018)
Bobbie Kelsey (2017–2018)
Latricia Trammell (2019–2022)
Fred Williams (2019–2022)
Seimone Augustus (2021–2022)
Chris Koclanes (2023–present)
Danielle Viglione (2023-present)

Statistics 

|-
! style="width:8%;"|PPG
! style="width:8%;"|RPG
! style="width:8%;"|APG
! style="width:8%;"|PPG
! style="width:8%;"|RPG
! style="width:8%;"|FG%
|-
| 1997
| L. Leslie (15.9)
| L. Leslie (9.5)
| P. Toler (5.1)
| 74.0 vs 71.8
| 34.8 vs 32.9
| .446 vs .397
|-
| 1998
| L. Leslie (19.6)
| L. Leslie (10.2)
| P. Toler (4.8)
| 71.6 vs 72.3
| 34.0 vs 33.3
| .416 vs .411
|-
| 1999
| L. Leslie (15.6)
| L. Leslie (7.8)
| M. Mabika (3.5)
| 76.5 vs 72.4
| 33.3 vs 32.2
| .435 vs .410
|-

|-
! style="width:8%;"|PPG
! style="width:8%;"|RPG
! style="width:8%;"|APG
! style="width:8%;"|PPG
! style="width:8%;"|RPG
! style="width:8%;"|FG%
|-
| 2000
| L. Leslie (17.8)
| L. Leslie (9.6)
| U. Figgs (4.0)
| 75.5 vs 67.8
| 34.1 vs 30.6
| .440 vs .395
|-
| 2001
| L. Leslie (19.5)
| L. Leslie (9.6)
| U. Figgs (3.9)
| 76.3 vs 67.7
| 34.5 vs 28.8
| .451 vs .392
|-
| 2002
| L. Leslie (16.9)
| L. Leslie (10.4)
| N. Teasley (4.4)
| 76.6 vs 69.8
| 35.7 vs 30.0
| .445 vs .390
|-
| 2003
| L. Leslie (18.4)
| L. Leslie (10.0)
| N. Teasley (6.3)
| 73.5 vs 71.5
| 33.8 vs 32.5
| .418 vs .403
|-
| 2004
| L. Leslie (17.6)
| L. Leslie (9.9)
| N. Teasley (6.1)
| 73.4 vs 69.4
| 33.0 vs 31.4
| .437 vs .389
|-
| 2005
| C. Holdsclaw (17.0)
| L. Leslie (7.3)
| N. Teasley (3.7)
| 68.4 vs 69.0
| 29.5 vs 30.6
| .428 vs .418
|-
| 2006
| L. Leslie (20.0)
| L. Leslie (9.5)
| T. Johnson (5.0)
| 75.7 vs 72.8
| 35.4 vs 31.8
| .438 vs .400
|-
| 2007
| T. McWilliams (11.1)
| T. McWilliams (5.9)
| S. Baker (3.2)
| 74.5 vs 79.6
| 33.5 vs 34.7
| .408 vs .431
|-
| 2008
| C. Parker (18.5)
| C. Parker (9.5)
| S. Bobbitt (3.5)
| 76.4 vs 74.2
| 37.7 vs 33.1
| .424 vs .384
|-
| 2009
| L. Leslie (15.4)
| C. Parker (9.8)
| N. Quinn (3.5)
| 74.5 vs 73.5
| 36.7 vs 30.9
| .430 vs .399
|-

|-
! style="width:8%;"|PPG
! style="width:8%;"|RPG
! style="width:8%;"|APG
! style="width:8%;"|PPG
! style="width:8%;"|RPG
! style="width:8%;"|FG%
|-
| 2010
| T. Thompson (16.6)
| T. Thompson (6.2)
| T. Penicheiro (6.9)
| 77.9 vs 81.2
| 30.8 vs 35.3
| .441 vs .441
|-
| 2011
| C. Parker (18.5)
| C. Parker (8.6)
| T. Penicheiro (4.8)
| 77.1 vs 80.3
| 31.7 vs 34.8
| .445 vs .447
|-
| 2012
| K. Toliver (17.5)
| C. Parker (9.7)
| K. Toliver (4.9)
| 84.0 vs 78.3
| 36.9 vs 33.6
| .458 vs .416
|-
| 2013
| C. Parker (17.9)
| C. Parker (8.7)
| L. Harding (5.2)
| 81.9 vs 75.0
| 34.6 vs 33.6
| .475 vs .412
|-
| 2014
| C. Parker (19.4)
| C. ParkerN. Ogwumike (7.1)
| C. Parker (4.3)
| 77.4 vs 77.6
| 32.4 vs 33.6
| .457 vs .450
|-
| 2015
| C. Parker (19.4)
| C. Parker (10.1)
| C. Parker (6.3)
| 73.6 vs 74.6
| 32.1 vs 32.9
| .452 vs .415
|-
| 2016
| N. Ogwumike (19.7)
| N. Ogwumike (9.1)
| C. Parker (4.9)
| 83.0 vs 75.9
| 31.5 vs 32.4
| .487 vs .433
|-
| 2017
| N. Ogwumike (18.8)
| C. Parker (8.4)
| C. Gray (4.4)
| 83.5 vs 75.2
| 31.4 vs 31.9
| .479 vs .430
|-
| 2018
| C. Parker (17.9)
| C. Parker (8.2)
| C. Gray (5.1)
| 78.9 vs 77.0
| 31.3 vs 35.1
| .452 vs .450
|-
| 2019
| N. Ogwumike (16.1)
| N. Ogwumike (8.8)
| C. Gray (5.9)
| 80.1 vs 77.2
| 34.2 vs 36.3
| .432 vs .408
|-

|-
! style="width:8%;"|PPG
! style="width:8%;"|RPG
! style="width:8%;"|APG
! style="width:8%;"|PPG
! style="width:8%;"|RPG
! style="width:8%;"|FG%
|-
| 2020
| C. Parker (14.7)
| C. Parker (9.7)
| C. Gray (5.3)
| 84.9 vs 80.3
| 31.4 vs 34.1
| .481 vs .449
|-
| 2021
| N. Ogwumike (14.5)
| N. Ogwumike (6.5)
| E. Wheeler (4.8)
| 72.8 vs 77.1
| 29.2 vs 38.3
| .411 vs .419
|-
| 2022
| N. Ogwumike (18.1)
| N. Ogwumike (6.6)
| J. Canada (5.5)
| 79.4 vs 86.6
| 30.4 vs 35.2
| .446 vs .467

Media coverage 
Currently, some Sparks games are broadcast on Spectrum SportsNet, a local television channel in the  Southern California area, after agreeing to a multi-year broadcast deal with Time Warner Cable in March 2012 which was later acquired by Charter Communications in May 2016. Broadcasters for the Sparks games are Larry Burnett and Lisa Leslie. Previously, Sparks games were found on Fox Sports West and Prime Ticket and former analysts have included Derek Fisher and Ann Meyers.

All games (excluding blackout games, which are available on ESPN3.com) are broadcast to the WNBA LiveAccess game feeds on the league website. Furthermore, some Sparks games are broadcast nationally on ESPN, ESPN2, CBS, CBS Sports Network and ABC. The WNBA has reached an eight-year agreement with ESPN, which will pay right fees to the Sparks, as well as other teams in the league.

Currently, the team's games are not on radio; however, the team did bounce around several stations from 1999 to 2008.  The first two years had no broadcasts.  Then in 1999, the team signed with KWKU, a sister station to Spanish-language KWKW, licensed to Pomona, California.  According to an article in the Los Angeles Times published in this period, KWKU had no switchboard and no website.  In addition, its 500-watt signal reached only a handful of people in the greater L.A. area and was certainly nowhere near the team's home arenas.  In 2003, the team left KWKU for KLAC, which had summer time slots available after the Anaheim Angels' radio broadcasts had just left.  That lasted until 2006, when KLAC switched the broadcasts to XETRA, which carried the same format KLAC had before.  In 2007, the game broadcasts moved again, this time to KTLK, when XETRA switched its language of broadcasts from English to Spanish.  The Sparks and Clear Channel Communications (licensee of the last three stations mentioned) chose not to renew their contract after 2008.  Sparks radio broadcasts never covered a complete season; most nationally-televised games and many games from the Eastern time zone were not covered.  Burnett was the announcer.

All-time notes

Regular season attendance 
A sellout for a basketball game at The Forum (1997–2000) is 17,505.
A sellout for a basketball game at Staples Center (2001–present) is 19,079.

Draft picks 
1997 Elite Draft: Daedra Charles (8), Haixia Zheng (16)
1997: Jamila Wideman (3), Tamecka Dixon (14), Katrina Colleton (19), Travesa Gant (30)
1998: Allison Feaster (5), Octavia Blue (15), Rehema Stephens (25), Erica Kienast (35)
1999: Delisha Milton (4), Clarisse Machanguana (16), Ukari Figgs (28), La'Keshia Frett (40)
2000: Nicole Kubik (15), Paige Sauer (31), Marte Alexander (47), Nicky McCrimmon (63)
2001: Camille Cooper (16), Nicole Levandusky (32), Kelley Siemon (48), Beth Record (64)
2002: Rosalind Ross (16), Gergana Slavtcheva (30), Jackie Higgins (32), Rashana Barnes (48), Tiffany Thompson (64)
2003 Miami/Portland Dispersal Draft: Jackie Stiles (14)
2003: Schuye LaRue (27), Mary Jo Noon (42)
2004 Cleveland Dispersal Draft: Isabelle Fijalkowski (12)
2004: Christi Thomas (12), Doneeka Hodges (25)
2005: DeeDee Wheeler (26), Heather Schreiber (39)
2006: Lisa Willis (5), Willnett Crockett (22), Tiffany Porter-Talbert (36)
2008 Charlotte Dispersal Draft: Ayana Walker (12)
2007: Sidney Spencer (25), Amanda Brown (38)
2008: Candace Parker (1), Shannon Bobbitt (15), Sharnee’ Zoll (29)
2009 Houston Dispersal Draft: selection waived
2009: Lindsay Wisdom-Hylton (13), Ashley Paris (22), Britney Jordan (35)
2010 Sacramento Dispersal Draft: selection waived
2010: Bianca Thomas (12), Angel Robinson (20), Rashidat Junaid (32)
2011: Jantel Lavender (5), Elina Babkina (29, ineligible)
2012: Nneka Ogwumike (1), Farhiya Abdi (13), Khadijah Rushdan (15), Tyra White (16), April Sykes (28)
2013: A'dia Mathies (10), Brittany Chambers (22)
2014: Jennifer Hamson (23), Antonita Slaughter (35)
2015: Crystal Bradford (7), Cierra Burdick (14), Andrea Hoover (31)
2016: Jonquel Jones (6), Whitney Knight (15), Brianna Butler (23), Talia Walton (29)
2017: Sydney Weise (11), Saicha Grant-Allen (35)
2018: Maria Vadeeva (11), Shakayla Thomas (23), Julia Reisingerová (35)
2019: Kalani Brown (7), Marina Mabrey (19), Ángela Salvadores (31)
2020: Beatrice Mompremier (20), Leonie Fiebich (22), Tynice Martin (34)
2021: Jasmine Walker (7), Stephanie Watts (10), Arella Guirantes (22), Ivana Raca (28), Aina Ayuso (34)
2022: Rae Burrell (9), Kianna Smith (16), Olivia Nelson-Ododa (19), Amy Atwell (27)

All-Stars 

1997: No All-Star Game
1998: No All-Star Game
1999: Lisa Leslie
2000: Lisa Leslie, Mwadi Mabika, Delisha Milton
2001: Tamecka Dixon, Lisa Leslie
2002: Tamecka Dixon, Lisa Leslie, Mwadi Mabika
2003: Tamecka Dixon, Lisa Leslie, Nikki Teasley
2004: Mwadi Mabika, Nikki Teasley
2005: Chamique Holdsclaw, Lisa Leslie
2006: Lisa Leslie
2007: Taj McWilliams-Franklin
2008: No All-Star Game
2009: Lisa Leslie, Tina Thompson
2010: Candace Parker
2011: Candace Parker
2012: No All-Star Game
2013: Nneka Ogwumike, Candace Parker, Kristi Toliver
2014: Nneka Ogwumike, Candace Parker
2015: Jantel Lavender, Nneka Ogwumike
2016: No All-Star Game
2017: Chelsea Gray, Nneka Ogwumike, Candace Parker
2018: Chelsea Gray, Candace Parker
2019: Chelsea Gray, Nneka Ogwumike
2020: No All-Star Game
2021: None
2022: Nneka Ogwumike

Olympians 
2000: Lisa Leslie, Delisha Milton
2004: Lisa Leslie
2008: Lisa Leslie, Candace Parker, Delisha Milton-Jones
2012: Candace Parker, Jenna O'Hea (AUS)
2016: Ana Dabovic (SER)
2020: None

Honors and awards 

1997 All-WNBA First Team: Lisa Leslie
1997 Sportsmanship Award: Haixia Zheng
1998 All-WNBA Second Team: Lisa Leslie
1999 All-WNBA Second Team: Lisa Leslie
1999 All-Star Game MVP: Lisa Leslie
2000 All-WNBA First Team: Lisa Leslie
2000 Coach of the Year: Michael Cooper
2001 Most Valuable Player: Lisa Leslie
2001 Finals MVP: Lisa Leslie
2001 All-WNBA First Team: Lisa Leslie
2001 All-WNBA Second Team: Tamecka Dixon
2001 All-Star Game MVP: Lisa Leslie
2001 Peak Performer (FG%): Latasha Byears
2002 All-WNBA First Team: Lisa Leslie
2002 All-WNBA First Team: Mwadi Mabika
2002 Finals MVP: Lisa Leslie
2002 All-Star Game MVP: Lisa Leslie
2003 All-WNBA First Team: Lisa Leslie
2003 All-WNBA Second Team: Nikki Teasley
2003 All-Star Game MVP: Nikki Teasley
2004 Most Valuable Player: Lisa Leslie
2004 All-WNBA First Team: Lisa Leslie
2004 All-WNBA Second Team: Nikki Teasley
2004 Defensive Player of the Year: Lisa Leslie
2004 Peak Performer (Rebounds): Lisa Leslie
2005 All-WNBA Second Team: Lisa Leslie
2005 All-Defensive Second Team: Lisa Leslie
2006 Most Valuable Player: Lisa Leslie
2006 All-Decade Team: Lisa Leslie
2006 All-WNBA First Team: Lisa Leslie
2006 All-Defensive First Team: Lisa Leslie
2007 All-Rookie Team: Marta Fernandez
2007 All-Rookie Team: Sidney Spencer
2008 Most Valuable Player: Candace Parker
2008 Rookie of the Year: Candace Parker
2008 All-WNBA First Team: Lisa Leslie
2008 All-WNBA First Team: Candace Parker
2008 Defensive Player of the Year: Lisa Leslie
2008 All-Defensive First Team: Lisa Leslie
2008 All-Rookie Team: Candace Parker
2008 Peak Performer (Rebounds): Candace Parker
2009 All-WNBA Second Team: Lisa Leslie
2009 All-WNBA Second Team: Candace Parker
2009 All-Defensive Second Team: Lisa Leslie
2009 All-Defensive Second Team: Candace Parker
2009 Peak Performer (Rebounds): Candace Parker
2010 Peak Performer (Assists): Ticha Penicheiro
2012 Rookie of the Year: Nneka Ogwumike
2012 Most Improved Player: Kristi Toliver
2012 Coach of the Year: Carol Ross
2012 All-WNBA First Team: Candace Parker
2012 All-Defensive First Team: Alana Beard
2012 All-Defensive Second Team: Candace Parker
2012 All-Rookie Team: Nneka Ogwumike
2013 Most Valuable Player: Candace Parker
2013 All-WNBA First Team: Candace Parker
2014 All-WNBA First Team: Candace Parker
2014 All-WNBA Second Team: Nneka Ogwumike
2014 All-Defensive Second Team: Alana Beard
2015 All-Rookie Team: Ana Dabović
2015 All-Defensive First Team: Nneka Ogwumike
2015 All-WNBA Second Team: Candace Parker
2016 Finals MVP: Candace Parker
2016 Most Valuable Player: Nneka Ogwumike
2016 Sixth Woman of the Year: Jantel Lavender
2016 All-Defensive First Team: Alana Beard
2016 All-Defensive First Team: Nneka Ogwumike
2017 Defensive Player of the Year: Alana Beard
2017 All-WNBA Second Team: Chelsea Gray, Nneka Ogwumike
2018 Defensive Player of the Year: Alana Beard
2018 All-WNBA Second Team: Candace Parker
2019 Kim Perrot Sportsmanship Award: Nneka Ogwumike
2019 All-WNBA First Team: Chelsea Gray
2019 All-WNBA Second Team: Nneka Ogwumike
2019 All-Defensive First Team: Nneka Ogwumike
2020 Defensive Player of the Year: Candace Parker
2020 Peak Performer (Rebounds): Candace Parker
2020 All-Defensive Second Team: Brittney Sykes
2020 All-WNBA First Team: Candace Parker
2021 All-Defensive First Team: Brittney Sykes
2022 All-Defensive Second Team: Brittney Sykes
2022 All-WNBA Second Team: Nneka Ogwumike

Notes

References

External links
December 6, 2006 press release on the change of ownership

 
Women's National Basketball Association teams
Basketball teams established in 1997
Sparks
Basketball teams in California
1997 establishments in California